The Turkey Town Monument is an outdoor Confederate memorial installed near Gadsden, Alabama, in the United States. It was erected in 1992 by the Turkey Town Valley Camp 1512 Sons of Confederate Veterans. Inscriptions on the monument read:

See also

 List of Confederate monuments and memorials

References

1992 establishments in Alabama
1992 sculptures
Buildings and structures in Etowah County, Alabama
Confederate States of America monuments and memorials in Alabama
Outdoor sculptures in Alabama